Portia may refer to:

Biology
Portia (spider), a genus of jumping spiders
Anaea troglodyta or Portia, a brush-footed butterfly
Portia tree, a plant native to Polynesia

Medication
A form of birth control made of ethinylestradiol/levonorgestrel

Other uses
Portia (moon), a moon of Uranus
Portia Club, a women's club in Payette, Idaho/USA
Portia, Missouri, a community in the United States
PORTIA portfolio-management software from Thomson Financial
HMS Lennox (1914) or HMS Portia, a Laforey-class destroyer launched in 1914

People with the given name
Portia Arthur (born 1990), Ghanaian author, writer and reporter
Porcia Catonis, the wife of Roman senator Marcus Junius Brutus (fictionalized as  a character in William Shakespeare's play Julius Caesar as "Portia")
Portia Dawson, American actress
Portia de Rossi or Portia DeGeneres, Australian-born actress
Portia Doubleday, American actress
Portia Geach (1873–1959), Australian artist and feminist
Portia Holman (1903–1983), Australian child psychiatrist 
Portia Mansfield (1887–1979), American dance educator and choreographer
Portia Robinson (1926–2023), Australian historian
Portia Simpson-Miller, political leader of Jamaica's People's National Party and Prime Minister of Jamaica
Portia White, Canadian singer
Portia Zvavahera (born 1985), Zimbabwean painter
Portia, pen name of Abigail Adams (1744-1818)
Portia, pen name of Grizelda Elizabeth Cottnam Tonge (1803-1825)

Fictional
Portia (The Merchant of Venice), a character in William Shakespeare's play The Merchant of Venice
Portia Quayne, the protagonist in The Death of the Heart by Elizabeth Bowen
Portia Gibbons, character on The Mighty B!
Portia, a minor character in The Hunger Games
Portia Copeland, a character in Carson McCullers' novel The Heart Is a Lonely Hunter
Portia Blake, the lead character in the American radio and television soap opera Portia Faces Life
Portia, the name for the frequently changed spider protagonist in Children of Time (novel), a novel by Adrian Tchaikovsky
Portia, Door's mother in Neverwhere, a novel by Neil Gaiman

See also
 Porch 
 Porcia (disambiguation)
 Porsche (disambiguation)